

Fennoscandia (Finnish, Swedish and) or the Fennoscandian Peninsula is the geographical peninsula in Europe, which includes the Scandinavian and Kola peninsulas, mainland Finland, and Karelia. Administratively this roughly encompasses the mainlands of Finland, Norway and Sweden, as well as Murmansk Oblast, much of the Republic of Karelia, and parts of northern Leningrad Oblast in Russia.

Its name comes from the Latin words Fennia (Finland) and Scandia (Scandinavian). The term was first used by the Finnish geologist Wilhelm Ramsay in 1898.

Geologically, the area is distinct because its bedrock is Archean granite and gneiss with very little limestone, in contrast to adjacent areas in Europe.

The similar term Fenno-Scandinavia is sometimes used as a synonym for Fennoscandia. Both terms are sometimes used in English to refer to a cultural or political grouping of Finland with Sweden, Norway and Denmark (the latter country is closely connected culturally and politically, but not part of the Fennoscandian Peninsula), which is a subset of the Nordic countries.

See also

References

Further reading 
 Ramsay, W., 1898. Über die Geologische Entwicklung der Halbinsel Kola in der Quartärzeit. Fennia 16 (1), 151 p.

External links
 Geological Map of the Fennoscandian Shield
 THE FENNOSCANDIAN SHIELD WITHIN FENNOSCANDIA

 
Archean geology
Geology of Finland
Geography of Karelia
Geology of Norway
Geology of Sweden
Peninsulas of Europe
1890s neologisms
Regions of Eurasia